A reference table (or table of reference) may mean a set of references that an author may have cited or gained inspiration from whilst writing an article, similar to a bibliography.

It can also mean an information table that is used as a quick and easy reference for things that are difficult to remember such as comparing imperial with metric measurements. This kind of data is known as reference data.

In the context of database design a reference table is a table into which an enumerated set of possible values of a certain field data type is divested. It is also called a domain table because it represents the domain for the columns that reference it. For example, in a relational database model of a warehouse the entity 'Item' may have a field called 'status' with a predefined set of values such as 'sold', 'reserved', 'out of stock'. In a purely designed database these values would be divested into an extra entity or Reference Table called 'status' in order to achieve database normalisation. The entity 'status' in this case has no true representative in the real world but rather would an exceptional case where the attribute of a certain database entity is divested into its own table. The advantage of doing this is that internal functionality and optional conditions within the database and the software which utilizes it are easier to modify and extend on that particular aspect.  Establishing an enterprise-wide view of reference tables is called master data management.

Data management